Frank Scott Kmet (born March 13, 1970) is a former American football defensive end in the National Football League. He played college football at Purdue and went to high school at John Hersey High School in Arlington Heights, Illinois.

Kmet was drafted by the Buffalo Bills in the fourth round of the 1992 NFL Draft. Although he also spent time with the Green Bay Packers, Cleveland Browns, and Chicago Bears, he never played a game in the NFL.

College career
After starring in football and wrestling at John Hersey High School (being named all-state by the Chicago Tribune in the former during his senior year), Kmet committed to Purdue University as part of the second-ranked recruiting class in the nation.

As a freshman in 1988, he was the backup left end. In 1990, he received an honorable mention for All-Big Ten Conference after recording 12 tackles-for-loss (fifth most in the conference) and 95 tackles (fourth most on the team). For his senior year in 1991 under new head coach Jim Colletto's 5–2 defense, he switched to defensive tackle and was named a team captain. However, in October, he broke his leg in the 28–7 win over Wisconsin, ending his college career.

Professional career

Kmet's recovery from his leg injury saw him begin walking again in January 1992 before it fully healed a month later, though he continued to feel discomfort in the leg until spring. He attended the NFL Scouting Combine in February, but was restricted to the bench press and measurements.

Projected by Mel Kiper Jr. as a sixth-round selection in the 1992 NFL Draft, Kmet participated in pre-draft workouts with the Atlanta Falcons, Cleveland Browns, New York Giants and Jets, and Philadelphia Eagles. He was drafted 111th overall in the fourth round by the Buffalo Bills, but was released on August 25.

Kmet was claimed by the Green Bay Packers two days after his release by Buffalo, only to be cut again on August 31. He spent two weeks on the Browns' practice squad before being waived on September 17.

Kmet signed with the Chicago Bears in 1993; head coach Dave Wannstedt praised him in May minicamp, describing him as "doing a nice job. He was a fourth-round draft pick and he hurt his leg. He's up to about 290 pounds and I think he'll be in the mix."
He was waived on August 30 and assigned to the Bears' practice squad for the regular season.

Kmet returned to the Bears in 1994 and converted to offensive line as a guard. His final seasons with the team saw him get signed in the spring and released in August.
 The 1995 offseason, during which he played guard and center, was also marred by an infected finger that placed him on the injury report. During his tenure in Chicago, he attracted notoriety from his teammates for his pranks; such antics included pouring buckets of water on players in their dormitories, applying Vaseline to chinstraps, and itching powder to shorts.

Summer 1996 saw him switch back to defense as part of return stints with the Bills and Packers, both of which ended prior to the regular season, before he concluded his playing career. The following year, Kmet and Bears defensive tackle Jim Flanigan established Timeout, a monthly newspaper covering Chicago-area high school sports.

Personal life
Kmet was diagnosed with diabetes during his sophomore year of high school.

He is the father of current Chicago Bears tight end Cole Kmet.

References

Living people
1970 births
Players of American football from Illinois
American football defensive ends
American football offensive guards
Buffalo Bills players
Chicago Bears players
Cleveland Browns players
Green Bay Packers players
Purdue Boilermakers football players
John Hersey High School alumni